Bosara emarginaria is a moth in the family Geometridae first described by George Hampson in 1893. It is found on Borneo and in Sri Lanka, the north-eastern Himalayas and Hong Kong. The habitat consists of lowland dipterocarp forests.

The wingspan is about  inch (17 mm).

The larvae possibly feed on Breynia species.

References

Moths described in 1893
Eupitheciini
Moths of Asia